Anna Proclemer, sometimes credited Anna Vivaldi (30 May 1923 – 25 April 2013), was an Italian stage, film and television actress and voice actress.

Born in Trento, Proclemer was the daughter of an engineer and a housewife. She debuted on stage in 1942, at the Rome University Theatre with the play Our Goddess directed by Massimo Bontempelli. In 1946 she married the writer Vitaliano Brancati, with whom she had a daughter, Antonia, born 6 May 1947, and from whom she separated shortly before his death in 1954.

From 1952 to 1955 Proclemer was a member of the stage company "Compagnia Teatro d’Arte Italiano", directed by Vittorio Gassman and Luigi Squarzina, then she was directed by Giorgio Strehler at the Piccolo Teatro of Milan and, starting from 1956, she worked extensively with Giorgio Albertazzi, with whom she also had a sentimental relationship.

Her last role was in Ferzan Özpetek's Magnifica presenza; for her performance she was awarded with a special Globo d'oro in 2012.

Filmography

References

Further reading

External links 
 
 

Italian film actresses
People from Trento
Italian stage actresses
Italian television actresses
Italian voice actresses
1923 births
2013 deaths